The Metropolitan Railroad was an early street railway in the Boston, Massachusetts area. Formed in 1853 to provide horsecar service between Boston and Roxbury, it quickly expanded to become the largest railway company in the region, with operations over more than ninety miles of track and an annual ridership of over forty-two million passengers per year. It ended operations in 1887 as a result of the consolidation plan which united nearly all Boston streetcar lines into the West End Street Railway.

Formation 
The Metropolitan Railroad was an early pioneer in the effort to bring street railway service to Boston, replacing the older horse-drawn omnibus lines which had come to be viewed as expensive and unreliable. The company received its charter on May 21, 1853, by the Massachusetts General Court, by which it was enabled to build a rail line connecting downtown Boston with the then-independent town of Roxbury. John P. Ober, a former Boston alderman, served as first president of the new organization.

Although the Metropolitan was one of the first railway companies to be established in the Boston area, defects in its charter and community opposition to its proposed lines significantly delayed the commencement of its operations. The company was unable to secure approval to lay tracks between Dover (now East Berkeley) and Boylston streets until late 1856, by which time a competing line, the Cambridge Railroad, had already begun providing railway service between Boston and Cambridge. Eventually, however, the company was able to complete a single track as far as Boylston Street, and on September 18, 1856, municipal authorities of Roxbury boarded a car and were taken for a ride along the line.

The original route of the Metropolitan ran from Boylston Market, at the corner of Boylston and Washington streets, to Eliot Square in Roxbury via Washington Street. On October 3, the route was extended along Tremont Street as far north as Scollay Square (now Government Center), returning along Washington Street and Harrison Avenue, and on October 11 a double track was completed as far as the Tremont House near King's Chapel. The line, which offered service between the two municipalities at a speed of seven miles per hour, quickly proved to be a popular one, and in its first full year of operations almost four million passengers were carried on 116,560 trips. By statute, fares for the line within the city of Boston were initially capped at five cents per trip.

Expansion 
Over the next three decades, the Metropolitan Railroad received grants to lay its lines on dozens of additional locations in Boston and Roxbury, including in downtown and the West and South Ends; at the same time, it undertook a strategy of acquiring or leasing the lines of several competing railways, enabling it to significantly expand its foothold in Boston and a number of surrounding towns in the process. Within a few years of its incorporation it had cemented its status as the largest street railway company in the city, ahead of the other principal railroads of the Union/Cambridge, South Boston, and Middlesex.

In 1858 the Metropolitan was authorized by the legislature to acquire the West Roxbury Railroad, which provided service between Roxbury and West Roxbury, and in 1859 it received similar permission to purchase the franchise and property of the Brookline Railroad. In 1863 the company expanded into Dorchester with the absorption of the Dorchester Railway and Dorchester Expansion Railway, which collectively connected that town to Boston with lines along Dorchester Avenue and several other streets, and a year later Dorchester and Roxbury Railroad was also acquired.

In 1864 the Metropolitan made a bid on the Suffolk Railroad, which operated in East Boston and held an East Boston-Downtown line running via ferryboats to Hanover Street in the North End and thence to Scollay Square. The company was successful in absorbing the rail lines of the Suffolk, but its attempts to secure the ferry lines were stymied by Boston city officials, and it was eventually directed to remove the tracks connecting to the ferry terminals in 1871.

In 1865 the Chlesea and East Boston Railroad, which connected East Boston and Chelsea via the Meridian Street Bridge, was absorbed by the Metropolitan, and in 1868 the Brookline and Back Bay Street Railway, running from Brookline Village to Roxbury Crossing, was taken over. In 1878 the Boston and West Roxbury Railroad, which had already leased its line to the Metropolitan several years prior, was formally consolidated with the company.

Middle years 

Complaints that the Metropolitan was engaging in monopolistic behavior eventually led to calls for reform, and in 1872 the Highland Street Railway was chartered with the avowed purpose of competing with the company for business around its original Boston and Roxbury lines. Over the next several years the two railway companies were major rivals, with Highland usage of Metropolitan tracks presenting a particular point of contention; at the same time, the Highland constructed a new line along Shawmut Avenue to compete with the Metropolitan and gradually expanded its presence in Roxbury, Dorchester, and the South End.

In 1874 Calvin A. Richards was elected as president of the Metropolitan, having previously served for eight months as a member of the board of directors. Although a newcomer to the railway industry, his firm style of management quickly enabled the company to recover from what had previously been a poor period of performance, and the financial situation of the Metropolitan was significantly improved as a result. Over the next thirteen years he remained as president of the railway, making him its longest-serving executive by far.

Consolidation 

In the fall of 1886, two new street railway companies were formed, the West End Street Railway and the Suburban Street Railway. The original incorporators started as a land company, with the goal of connecting and expanding the Boston and Brookline portions of Beacon Street in order to enhance the value of the land that they held along that route. In order to further increase the marketability of the land, the two railways were formed to provide transportation to the area, and the West End Railway was granted the right to enter Boston through the avenue and the neighborhood of Back Bay.

To the directors of the Metropolitan, the emergence of the West End was seen as a threat to their business, and in order to counter this new rival they decided to make an effort to expand their own operations. The company initially made an attempt to take over the South Boston Railroad, which at that time was already running more car miles on Metropolitan tracks than on its own, and when this failed it alternatively filed proposals to extend its own lines into the South Boston peninsula. Talks with the directors of the Cambridge Railroad were also initiated, and in February 1887 the two railways announced an agreement to unite into a new consolidated company, which would be among the largest in the country once completed.

These actions by the Metropolitan quickly drew alarm from the managers of the West End, and in response the latter suddenly made a bid to acquire a controlling interest in all of the railway companies of Boston (excepting only the Lynn and Boston). Within a short time, majority positions in the Metropolitan and the other companies had been secured, and in June 1887 the state legislature passed a bill allowing the West End to consolidate with any other railway operating in Boston.

Shortly after the passage of the West End Bill, the managers of the West End made an offer to the remaining shareholders of the Metropolitan for 1.25 shares of West End 8% preferred stock in exchange for each Metropolitan share held. The board of the Metropolitan, which by then had become an advocate for consolidation, recommended acceptance of the proposal, and President Richards decided to set a precedent by being the first individual to exchange his shares. In November 1887 consolidation was formally completed, with the West End absorbing the Metropolitan, together with the South Boston and Consolidated (successor to the Middlesex and Highland) railroads, on November 12, and absorption of the Cambridge following soon after on November 19.

Notes

References

 
 
 
 
 
 
 
 
 
 
 
 
 
 
 
 
 
 
 
 
 
 
 
 
 
 
 
 

Streetcars in the Boston area
Defunct Massachusetts railroads
Defunct public transport operators in the United States
American companies established in 1853
1853 establishments in Massachusetts
American companies disestablished in 1887
1887 disestablishments in Massachusetts
Railway companies established in 1853
Railway companies disestablished in 1887